John Joseph Carlisle (c. 1863 – 18 June 1929) was an Australian politician.

He was born in Mansfield to farmer William Carlisle and Anna Crockett. Following his father's death in 1871 the family moved to Yarrawonga, and Carlisle grew up to become a farmer in the area. He served on Yarrawonga Shire Council from 1895 to 1907 and was president from 1900 to 1901. In 1903 he was elected to the Victorian Legislative Assembly for Benalla and Yarrawonga, transferring to Benalla at the election the following year. A Liberal who joined the Economy faction of the Nationalist Party in 1917, he was a minister without portfolio from November 1917 to March 1918. In 1920 he joined the Victorian Farmers' Union, which became the Country Party. In 1926 he left the party after a dispute over a proposed redistribution, and stood at the 1927 election as an independent but was defeated. Carlisle died in Heidelberg in 1929.

References

1863 births
1929 deaths
Nationalist Party of Australia members of the Parliament of Victoria
National Party of Australia members of the Parliament of Victoria
Independent members of the Parliament of Victoria
Members of the Victorian Legislative Assembly